SS Columbus may refer to one of the following passenger steamers:

 SS Columbus (1903), built by Harland and Wolff for the Dominion Line, but was transferred to the White Star Line in October 1903 and renamed , sinking in a collision in 1909.
 , launched in 1914 for the North German Lloyd but never completed; handed over to the United Kingdom as war reparation; became SS Homeric of the White Star Line; sold for scrapping, 1935
 , launched in 1914 for the North German Lloyd as Hindenburg but never completed; completed in 1924 as Columbus; scuttled in 1939 to avoid capture by the British; passengers and crew rescued by United States cruiser Tuscaloosa

Ship names